Grant Van De Casteele (born May 10, 1991) is an American professional soccer player who plays as a defender.

Career

College
Van De Casteele played four years of college soccer at the University of Notre Dame between 2010 and 2014. He was elected captain his senior year and helped steer the Irish to the program's first ever national championship in his final collegiate season.

Professional
On January 16, 2014, Van De Casteele was selected in the first round, 19th overall, in the 2014 MLS SuperDraft by Colorado Rapids.

Van De Casteele made his debut in a 3-4 loss to LA Galaxy on August 20, 2014.

In February 2016, Van De Casteele retired from professional soccer to pursue other professional interests.

References

External links 
 

1991 births
Living people
Sportspeople from Plano, Texas
American soccer players
Notre Dame Fighting Irish men's soccer players
Colorado Rapids players
Rochester New York FC players
Association football defenders
Soccer players from Texas
Colorado Rapids draft picks
Major League Soccer players
USL Championship players